Borisoglebskoye is a rural locality (a village) in Kubenskoye Rural Settlement, Vologodsky District, Vologda Oblast, Russia. The population was 30 as of 2002.

Geography 
Borisoglebskoye is located 65 km northwest of Vologda (the district's administrative centre) by road. Mynchakovo is the nearest rural locality.

References 

Rural localities in Vologodsky District